Megachile oculiformis is a species of bee in the family Megachilidae. It was described by Rayment in 1956.

References

Oculiformis
Insects described in 1956